Anenthemonae is a suborder of sea anemones in the order Actiniaria. It comprises those sea anemones with atypical arrangement of mesenteries for actiniarians.

Superfamilies and families in the suborder Anenthemonae include:
 Superfamily Actinernoidea Stephenson, 1922
 Actinernidae Stephenson, 1922
 Halcuriidae Carlgren, 1918
 Superfamily Edwardsioidea Andres, 1881
 Edwardsiidae Andres, 1881

Classification 
The differential feature between the 2 suborders of sea anemone; Enthemonae and Anenthemonae is that they are primarily characterised by having basilar muscles, mesoglea marginal sphincter and they lack acontia and carotinoids. They however, rarely lack these types of basilar muscles and sphincters causing the outer column to be smooth in texture.

References

 
Actiniaria